Emir  is a name derived from the Arabic title Emir or Amir. In Turkish Emir means command, order, prince, local king. Notable people with the name include:

Given name
 Emir (singer) (born 1980), Turkish pop singer
 Emir Bekrić, Serbian hurdler
 Emir Işılay, Turkish musician
 Emir Kusturica, Serbian filmmaker
 Emir Lokmić, male alpine skier from Bosnia and Herzegovina
 Emir Mkademi, Tunisian football (soccer) player
 Emir Mutapčić (born 1960), Bosnian basketball player and coach 
 Emir Preldžič, Turkish basketball player of Bosnian origin 
 Emir Spahić, Bosnian football (soccer) player

Honorific title
Arslan family (Lebanon)
Emir Shakib Arslan
Emir Majid Arslan
Emir Faysal Arslan, son of Emir Majid Arslan
Emir Talal Arslan, son of Emir Majid Arslan
Emir Fakhr-al-Din II
Shihab family (Lebanon)
Emir Bashir I
Emir Bashir Shihab II
Emir Bashir III

See also
Amir (name)
Amir (disambiguation)
Emir (disambiguation)
Emirate, a political territory that is ruled by a dynastic Muslim monarch styled emir. It also means principality.

References